Events during the year 2008 in Italy.

Incumbents
President: Giorgio Napolitano
Prime Minister: 
Romano Prodi (until 8 May) 
Silvio Berlusconi (from 8 May)

Events

January 
8 January : due to the worsening of the waste crisis in Campania and the riots that broke out as a result, the government appoints Gianni De Gennaro as liquidator and decides to send the Army to the region.
24 January: Start of the 2008 Italian political crisis
26 January : the president of the Sicilian Region, Salvatore Cuffaro, resigns amidst the controversy after being sentenced in the first instance to 5 years for personal aiding and abetting against defendants in Mafia trials.

February 
6 February : the President of the Republic Giorgio Napolitano decrees the dissolution of the chambers and the end of the 15th legislature, after the failure of the exploratory assignment entrusted to the President of the Senate Franco Marini.  General elections are set for 13 and 14 April.

March 
15 March: a hundred thousand parade in Bari against the mafia in a demonstration organized by Libera

May 
8 May: Silvio Berlusconi takes over as prime minister, succeeding Romano Prodi

June 
2 June: the famous TV series for children by nickelodeon iCarly is broadcast for the first time dubbed in Italian.

September 

 14 September: Sebastian Vettel wins the Italian Grand Prix, marking him the youngest Formula One winner until Max Verstappen beats Vettel's record at the 2016 Spanish Grand Prix.

October 
30 October : Sardinia becomes the first region in Europe to receive only the digital terrestrial signal, thus carrying out the first switch-off of the analog signal in Italy.

December 
 31 December: Italy's mandate as non-permanent member of the United Nations Security Council expires.

Deaths

January
5 January – Giovanni Rinaldo Coronas, politician, police chief and Interior Minister (b. 1919).
6 January – Vittorio Tomassetti, Bishop of Fano-Fossombrone-Cagli-Pergola (b. 1930).
17 January – Giuliana Penzi, dancer and choreographer (b. 1918).
18 January – 
Pier Miranda Ferraro, opera tenor (b. 1924).
Ugo Pirro, screenwriter and novelist (b. 1920).
20 January – Duilio Loi, boxer (b. 1929).

February
3 February – Ernesto Illy, food chemist and businessman (b. 1925) 
11 February – Carolina Tronconi, gymnast, Olympic silver medalist (b. 1913).
13 February – Michele Greco, Mafia boss (b. 1924).
16 February – 
Vittorio Lucarelli, fencer (b. 1928).
Fabio Presca, basketball player (b. 1930).
17 February – Nicola Agnozzi, Roman Catholic prelate (b. 1911).
22 February – Nunzio Gallo, singer (b. 1928).

March
3 March – Giuseppe Di Stefano, operatic tenor (b. 1921).
4 March – Tina Lagostena Bassi, lawyer and politician (b. 1926).
7 March – Leonardo Costagliola, footballer (b. 1921).
12 March – Lazare Ponticelli, Italian-born French veteran of World War I (b. 1897).
14 March – Chiara Lubich, Catholic activist (b. 1920).
18 March – Oreste Rizzini, voice actor (b. 1940).
24 March – Dina Sassoli, actress (b. 1920).

April
14 April – Marisa Sannia, singer (b. 1942).

July
23 July – Anna Maria Cantù, sprinter (b. 1923).
27 July – Marisa Merlini, actress (b. 1923).

August
14 August – Luigi Grossi, Olympic sprinter (b. 1925).

September
5 September – Mila Schön, fashion designer (b. 1916).

October
5 October – Leopoldo Elia, politician (b. 1925).

December
20 December – Samuele Bacchiocchi, theologian (b. 1938).
28 December – Claudio Vitalone, politician (b. 1936)

References 

 
2000s in Italy
Years of the 21st century in Italy
Italy
Italy